is a Japanese former wrestler who competed in the 1972 Summer Olympics.

References

External links
 

1950 births
Living people
Olympic wrestlers of Japan
Wrestlers at the 1972 Summer Olympics
Japanese male sport wrestlers
Asian Games bronze medalists for Japan
Asian Games medalists in wrestling
Wrestlers at the 1974 Asian Games
Medalists at the 1974 Asian Games
20th-century Japanese people
21st-century Japanese people
World Wrestling Championships medalists